Chuck Greenberg (March 25, 1950 – September 4, 1995), born in Chicago, Illinois, was an American musical artist, composer and producer.

He began his musical career in the Midwest, including a backup band tour with the Bee Gees, then relocated to Los Angeles, California in 1978.
Though Greenberg's band Shadowfax, first formed in 1972, his success as a producer and artist was marked by his series of recordings, with Alex de Grassi and Will Ackerman, beginning in 1982 on the Windham Hill label.  Shadowfax won a Grammy in 1988 for Best New Age Performance for Folksongs for a Nuclear Village.
This ground-breaking work combined jazz, rock, folk, and world music elements.

His work on the lyricon, the first electronic wind instrument, which he helped develop with engineer Bill Bernardi, became the signature sound of Shadowfax.

In live performances, Greenberg appeared as a featured artist at Carnegie Hall, Montreux, Ravinia, The Greek Theater, Wolf Trap, Red Rocks, and the Universal Theater, among others. His final work was a live Shadowfax recording and full-length concert from Santa Cruz, California, in 1995.

He died aged 45 on Santa Cruz Island, on  September 4, 1995, after suffering a heart attack, leaving a wife and three sons.

Discography
 From A Blue Planet (1991)

With Shadowfax
(see main Shadowfax discography)

References

Sources
 Greenberg, Joy (2006) A Pause in the Rain 
 Larkin, Colin (1995) The Guinness Encyclopedia of Popular Music 

 Rusch, Bob (Mar. 1976) Cadence Vol. 1, No. 3, p. 44
 Sonic Images Press Release
 Yurochko, Bob (1993) A Short History of Jazz

External links
 His website

American jazz flautists
American jazz saxophonists
American male saxophonists
1950 births
1995 deaths
20th-century American saxophonists
20th-century American male musicians
American male jazz musicians
Shadowfax (band) members
20th-century flautists